Misak Metsarents or Medzarents (18 January 1886 – 5 July 1908) was a leading Western Armenian neo-romantic poet.

Biography 

Misak Metsarents was born Misak Metsadourian in the village of Pingian, near Agn in the Vilayet of Kharpert. In 1886, he moved with his family to Sepastia, where he attended the Aramian School. Until 1902, he attended the Anatolia Boarding School in Marzvan, which was run by American missionaries. From 1902 to 1905, he attended the Central School in Constantinople. However, tuberculosis forced him to leave his education, and he later died from the ailment July 5, 1908, at the age of 22.

Poetry
Metsarents began writing in 1901, with his first verses published in 1903. He also collaborated with many Western Armenian publications such as “Masis”, “Hanragitak”, “Eastern Press”, “Light”, “Courier”, “Manzumei Efkiar”, “Buzandion”. Much of his poetry discussed the despair of his inevitable mortality.

Legacy
The poet enriched Armenian poetry with his lyrical and genuine masterpieces, although Metsarents only managed to publish two volumes of poetry in his lifetime: “Dziadzan” (Rainbow) (1907) and “Nor dagher” (1907). He was commemorated in 2012 by his portrait appearing on an Armenian postal stamp.

References

External links 
Armsoul.com - Միսաք Մեծարենց 
METZARENTS THE MOVIE - a film about Misak Metsarents

1886 births
1908 deaths
Armenian male poets
Armenians from the Ottoman Empire
20th-century deaths from tuberculosis
20th-century Armenian poets
20th-century male writers
Tuberculosis deaths in the Ottoman Empire
Tuberculosis deaths in Turkey